Amblimont is a former commune in the Ardennes department in northern France. On 1 January 2016, it was merged into the commune Mouzon.

The inhabitants of the commune are known as Amblimontais or Amblimontaises

Geography
Amblimont is located some 11 km south-east of Sedan and 5 km west of Carignan. It can be accessed by the D964 road from Mairy in the north passing through the mid-western part of the commune and continuing south to Mouzon. Access to the village is by the Ruelle de la Goutelle going south-east from the D964. The village can also be accessed by other local roads in the east of the commune. The commune is mostly farmland with patches of forest in the east.

The Ruisseau de la Vignette rises in the commune and flows west to the Canal de l'Est (North branch) which forms the western border of the commune. A few streams rise in the east of the commune and flow east to join the Chiers river.

Neighbouring communes and villages

Heraldry

Administration

List of Successive Mayors

Demography
In 2012, the commune had 178 inhabitants.

Culture and heritage

Religious heritage
The Church of Saint-Georges contains two items that are registered as historical objects:
A Pulpit (18th century)
An Altar, 2 Statues, Retable, Painting, Statuette: Saint Georges and Roch, Christ on the cross, and Virgin and child (18th century)

See also
Communes of the Ardennes department

References

External links
Amblimont on the National Geographic Institute website 
Amblemont on the 1750 Cassini Map

Former communes of Ardennes (department)
Populated places disestablished in 2016